This is a list of Gujarati language films that were released in 2020. On 15 March 2020, all theatres in Gujarat were ordered to be closed following COVID-19 pandemic. They were reopened in October 2020.

Box-office collection

January–March

On 15 March 2020, all theatres in Gujarat were ordered to be closed following COVID-19 pandemic.

November–December

References

External links
 List of Gujarati films of 2020 at the Internet Movie Database

2020
Gujarati
Gujarati
2020s in Gujarat